is a Japanese tenor in opera and concert.

Biography
Makoto graduated from the Tokyo University of the Arts. He went to study in Italy in 1997, and continues to work there. He has recorded Bach cantatas in the complete set directed by Masaaki Suzuki, and the ongoing series directed by Rudolf Lutz.

References

External links
 Makoto Sakurada Bach Collegium Japan
 

Living people
Japanese tenors
21st-century Japanese male opera singers
Bach singers
1960 births